Stanislav Mikhailovich Duzhnikov (May 17, 1973 in Saransk) is a Russian actor of theater and cinema.

Biography
Stanislav Duzhnikov was born on May 17, 1973 in Saransk. On the stage he debuted at school. In 1998 he graduated from
Boris Shchukin Theatre Institute.

Personal life
Duzhnikov was married to actress Kristina Babushkina.

Selected filmography
 2000 Demobbed (ДМБ) as Tolya Pistemeyev
 2004 Down House (Даун Хаус) as Svinin
 2005 The Turkish Gambit (Турецкий гамбит ) as Semyon Alekseev
 2007 Paragraph 78 (Параграф 78) as Luba
 2009  Voronin's Family (Воронины) as Lyonya Voronin
 2010 Exporting Raymond as Lyonya Voronin
 2012 The Ballad of Uhlans (Уланская баллада) as Ptukha
 2013 Metro (Метро) as Mikhail
 2013 Metro (Метро) as Mikhail
 2021 Ivanov-Ivanov (Ивановы-Ивановы) as Boris Ivanov

References

External links
 
 Official website

1973 births
People from Saransk
Living people
Russian male film actors
Russian male television actors
Russian male stage actors
Russian male voice actors
20th-century Russian male actors
21st-century Russian male actors
Honored Artists of the Russian Federation